Sook-Ja Oh (born 26 May 1941) is a South Korean composer. She was born in Seoul, Korea and studied at Kyung Hee University, where she received a Bachelor of Arts in 1971 and a Master of Arts in 1973. She continued her studies in electronic music at Peabody College in the United States, and in orchestral conducting at the Mozarteum in Salzburg.

Works
Selected works include:
From the East cello and guitar (1995)
Monologue (1992)
A Water Drop
Art Songs (1977)

References

1941 births
Living people
20th-century classical composers
South Korean classical composers
Women classical composers
Kyung Hee University alumni
People from Seoul
20th-century women composers